The 1500 meters distance for men in the 2015–16 ISU Speed Skating World Cup will be contested over six races on six occasions, out of a total of World Cup occasions for the season, with the first occasion taking place in Calgary, Alberta, Canada, on 13–15 November 2015, and the final occasion taking place in Heerenveen, Netherlands, on 11–13 March 2016.

The defending champion is Denny Morrison of Canada.

Top three

Race medallists

Standings

References 

 
Men 1500